Juan Galindo (1802 – 30 January 1840) was an Irish-Honduran political activist and military and administrative officer under the Liberal government of the Federal Republic of Central America. He represented the government in a diplomatic mission to the United States and England. His duties in Central America allowed him to explore the region and examine Maya ruins. The reports on his findings earned him recognition as an early pioneer of Maya archaeology.

Early Years
Galindo was born in Dublin in 1802 as John Galindo. His father, Philemon Galindo was an Englishman of Spanish descent and his mother, Catherine Gough, was Irish. Both parents were actors who met while working at a theater in Bath. They married in Dublin in 1801. His early life is obscure and it is not known why or exactly when he left for the New World. Sources differ on his emigration but sometime before he was twenty he either joined Admiral Thomas Cochrane to fight for Chile's independence or he joined his uncle, a plantation owner in Jamaica.

The first clear record of his early career occurred in 1827 when he worked as secretary and translator for the British consul in Guatemala. By 1828 he was the superintendent for improvements at the port of Iztapa as well as a major in a Honduras battalion.

Federal Republic of Central America
In 1829 the Liberal forces led by Francisco Morazán invaded Guatemala. Galindo joined the Liberals and Morazán's army quickly brought the revolution to a successful end. Morazán established the Federal Republic of Central America and Galindo enjoyed the patronage of Morazán and Mariano Gálvez, the chief of state in Guatemala. The new federal congress granted Galindo naturalization papers and he changed his name to Juan.

Galindo undertook several military assignments for the new government, including officer of a military garrison at Omoa, commander of the port at Trujillo, and military governor of Petén. In 1834, he received a million-acre land grant in Petén with the stipulations that he pacify the native Lacandon Maya and settle the area in five years with colonists who would be loyal to the Guatemalan government. He soon realized that the boundary between Guatemala and British Honduras was in dispute and the British claimed that Galindo's new land grant belonged to British Honduras. British mahogany cutters were actively logging the area, depriving Galindo of the land's most valuable asset. When discussions with Frederick Chatfield in British Honduras failed to resolve the issue, Central America appointed Galindo as envoy to negotiate directly with the British Foreign Office in London.

Galindo left Central America in January, 1835, stopping first in Washington, DC in hopes of enlisting the United States to support his cause against Britain. In return, Galindo offered to provide information regarding possible canal routes through Nicaragua. He met with Secretary of State John Forsyth and President Andrew Jackson in May, 1835 but failed to gain their support. Galindo proceeded to London and arrived there in August. He had a meeting with Foreign Secretary Lord Palmerston soon after his arrival but then talks proceeded in a desultory fashion. By April 1836 Palmerston had determined not to work with Galindo and offered the expedient excuse that since Galindo was born a British subject, he could not represent a foreign government.

Without a clear title to his land grant in Petén, Galindo was unable to attract settlers. Instead, he petitioned Central America for another opportunity and was provided a grant on the Mosquito Coast. While still in London, Galindo recruited his father and other relatives to lead a group of colonists to settle on this remote coast. This enterprise ended in failure; the settlers were ill-equipped, lacked sufficient supplies, and found no way to earn a living once they arrived. By the time Galindo returned to Central America in 1836, the settlement had collapsed and his father had returned to England. He also found that his influence with the Central America government was greatly diminished.

The Liberal regime that had governed Central America was under pressure on several fronts. Galindo attempted to rally support against perceived British aggression but this effort failed to gain popular attention. When civil war broke out, he rejoined the army under Liberal general, Trinidad Cabañas. Cabañas was defeated by the joint forces of Honduras and Nicaragua near the city of Tegucigalpa and Galindo was killed on January 30, 1840, in the aftermath of the battle.

Maya archaeology
As military governor of Petén, Galindo undertook an exploratory trip down the Usumacinta River and then crossed overland to reach the Maya ruins at Palenque in April 1831. He spent a month exploring the site and wrote an account of the various structures, drew plans, and sketched several of the decorations he encountered. Later that year his account was published by the London Literary Gazette and the Geographical Society in Paris. He also sent a small collection of Maya objects to the Royal Society in London.

In 1834, Galindo was sent by the Central American government to survey and report on the ruins at Copán. He spent about ten weeks exploring the area, writing reports and sketching his findings. He wrote two brief reports for the London Literary Gazette and the American Antiquarian Society. A more detailed report with twenty-six illustrations was sent to the Société de Géographie in Paris and the original was sent to his government with the mistaken assumption that it would be published. Instead, it was filed away and "lost" for more than a hundred years when it was uncovered and published in 1945.

Although it was just a small part of his career, Galindo proved to be an astute observer and an effective communicator who earned recognition as an early pioneer of Maya archaeology. He wrote some thirty-two letters to the Société de Géographie sharing his ideas and insights. Galindo was one of the first to point out the close resemblance between the contemporary Maya peoples and the carved images of the ancient Maya to be found among the ruins. He correctly suggested that the original Maya civilization was created by the ancestors of the contemporary Mayas. He was also the first investigator to carefully copy the Maya hieroglyphics and identify them as a unique form of writing.

See also
 History of Central America

Notes

References

Further reading

Griffith, William J. "Galindo, Juan (1802–1840)." Encyclopedia of Latin American History and Culture, edited by Jay Kinsbruner and Erick D. Langer, 2nd ed., vol. 3, Charles Scribner's Sons, 2008, pp. 353–354.

External links
Juan Galindo at www.englishgalindos.co.uk

1802 births
1840 deaths
19th-century explorers
19th-century Mesoamericanists
Explorers of Central America
Guatemalan archaeologists
Guatemalan Mesoamericanists
Guatemalan people of Irish descent
Irish people of Spanish descent
Mayanists
Members of the American Antiquarian Society
Mesoamerican archaeologists